Austria competed at the 2012 Summer Olympics in London, from 27 July to 12 August 2012. The nation has competed at every edition of Summer Olympic Games, except the 1920 Summer Olympics in Antwerp. The Österreichisches Olympisches Comité sent a total of 70 athletes to the Games, 39 men and 31 women, to compete in 17 sports. This was approximately the same size as the previous Games, with the difference of one male athlete, the addition of one female athlete and three sporting events participated in. There was only a single competitor in eventing, fencing, rhythmic gymnastics, modern pentathlon, and Greco-Roman wrestling.

The Austrian team included past Olympic medalists: judoka Ludwig Paischer, who won silver in Beijing, and swimmer Markus Rogan, who was the nation's flag bearer at the opening ceremony. Rifle shooter and multiple time world champion Thomas Farnik, at age 45, competed at his sixth Olympics and was the oldest and most experienced team member. Meanwhile, two Austrian athletes made their fifth Olympic appearance: table tennis player and former world champion Werner Schlager, and slalom kayaker Helmut Oblinger, the husband of former Olympic bronze medalist Violetta Oblinger-Peters.

Austria, however, failed to win a single medal for the first time in since 1964, after achieving poor performance at these games. Hurdler Beate Schrott, butterfly swimmer Dinko Jukic, open skiff sailors Nico Delle Karth and Nikolaus Resch, sprint kayak pair Yvonne Schuring and Viktoria Schwarz, and modern pentathlete Thomas Daniel qualified successfully for the final rounds of their respective sports, but missed out of the medal standings.

Athletics

Austrian athletes have further achieved qualifying standards in their respective events (up to a maximum of 3 athletes in each event at the 'A' Standard, and 1 at the 'B' Standard).

Men
Track & road events

Field events

Women
Track & road events

Field events

Combined events – Heptathlon

Badminton

Canoeing

Slalom
Austria has qualified boats for the following events

Sprint
Austria has so far qualified boats for the following events

Qualification Legend: FA = Qualify to final (medal); FB = Qualify to final B (non-medal)

Cycling

Road
Austria has qualified two riders.

Mountain biking

Equestrian

Dressage

Eventing

Fencing

Austria has qualified 1 fencer.

Men

Gymnastics

Artistic
Men

Women

Rhythmic

Judo

Modern pentathlon

Austria has qualified 1 athlete.

Sailing

Austria has qualified 1 boat for each of the following events

Men

Women

Open

M = Medal race; EL = Eliminated – did not advance into the medal race

Shooting

Austria has ensured four quota places in the shooting events at the Games.

Men

Women

Swimming

Austria selected 11 swimmers to the team after achieving qualifying standards in their respective events (up to a maximum of 2 swimmers in each event at the Olympic Qualifying Time (OQT), and 1 at the Olympic Selection Time (OST)): Three of their swimmers had competed at their first Games, including medley swimmer Lisa Zaiser, who was also the nation's youngest athlete.

The Austrian swimmers also included the former backstroker and Olympic silver medalist Markus Rogan, competing in the men's 200 m individual medley event, and Dinko Jukic, brother of former Olympic swimmer Mirna Jukic, in the butterfly events. By results, Jukic qualified successfully for the finals in the men's 200 m butterfly event, but missed out of the medal standings. Rogan, another Olympic hopeful, was disqualified in the semi-finals due to a technical mistake during a turn.

Men

Women

Synchronized swimming

Austria has qualified 2 quota places in synchronized swimming.

Table tennis

Austria has qualified three athletes for singles table tennis events. Based on their world rankings as of 16 May 2011 Werner Schlager and Weixing Chen have qualified for the men's event; Jia Liu has qualified for the women's.

Men

Women

Tennis

Triathlon

Austria has qualified the following athletes.

Volleyball

Beach

Wrestling

Austria has qualified in the following events.

Men's Greco-Roman

References

External links

First 24 nominated (German language)

Summer Olympics
Nations at the 2012 Summer Olympics
2012